In cryptography, format-transforming encryption (FTE) refers to encryption where the format of the input plaintext and output ciphertext are configurable. Descriptions of formats can vary, but are typically compact set descriptors, such as a regular expression.

Format-transforming encryption is closely related to, and a generalization of, format-preserving encryption.

Applications of FTE

Restricted fields or formats 

Similar to format-preserving encryption, FTE can be used to control the format of ciphertexts. The canonical example is a credit card number, such as 1234567812345670 (16 bytes long, digits only).
However, FTE does not enforce that the input format must be the same as the output format.

Censorship circumvention 

FTE is used by the Tor Project to circumvent deep packet inspection by pretending to be some other protocols.

References

Cryptography
Content-control software
Internet censorship